Cinco Puntos Press is an imprint of publishing company Lee & Low Books. It is a general trade publisher that has received attention for its bilingual children's books and fiction and non-fiction focusing on the Mexico–United States border region. It was founded by novelist Lee Merrill Byrd and poet Bobby Byrd in 1985 and sold to Lee & Low in June 2021. It is known for its multi-cultural and political focus for both children and adults.

Notable authors
Cinco Puntos Press authors include Joe Hayes, Benjamin Alire Sáenz, Sergio Troncoso, Tim Tingle, George Ella Lyon, Dagoberto Gilb, David Romo, Lisa Sandlin, Robert Boswell, Gary Cartwright, Xavier Garza, James Carlos Blake, Subcomandante Marcos, Byrd Baylor, J.L. Powers, Youme Landowne, Paco Ignacio Taibo II, and many others.

NEA controversy
Cinco Puntos received national notoriety when, in March 1999, it published the book The Story of Colors / La Historia de los colores written by Subcomandante Marcos, the leader of the Zapatista Army of National Liberation in Mexico. Bill Ivey, chairperson of the National Endowment for the Arts—which had previously awarded $7,500 to Cinco Puntos Press for the publication of the story—pulled the funding on March 9, 1999 after being interviewed by Julia Preston of the Mexico City bureau of The New York Times. The NEA's move drew national attention to the book and Cinco Puntos when an article about the controversy was published on the front page of the New York Times. The Lannan Foundation provided Cinco Puntos Press with twice the amount of the lost funding and Cinco Puntos Press sold out their first printing of the book in days. Publisher Bobby Byrd made a personal statement on the Cinco Puntos Press website, stating: "It was a strange media frenzy, a true boon to Cinco Puntos. But real ideas and issues got lost in that frenzy, the most important of which is the indigenous struggle for autonomy and land in Chiapas."

Significant awards
The company has won several awards:

Lannan Foundation, 2005—Bobby Byrd and Lee Merrill Byrd awarded Cultural Freedom Fellowships for Excellence in Publishing
Before Columbus Foundation, The American Book Award, 1999, for Excellence in Publishing
Rocky Mountain Publishing Association—the Dwight A. Myers Award, 1997, for Excellence in Regional Publishing
Border Regional Library Association—the Southwest Book Award, 1993, for Excellence in Publishing

In addition, author Benjamin Alire Sáenz won a PEN/Faulkner Award for Fiction and a Lambda Literary Award in 2013 for his book Everything Begins and Ends at the Kentucky Club, published by Cinco Puntos in 2012.

References

External links
 Cinco Puntos Press Official site

Book publishing companies based in Texas
Companies based in El Paso, Texas
Publishing companies established in 1985
1985 establishments in Texas